Fishers Peak is a spur of the Ratón Mesa, which reaches the highest elevation of  the collective mesas of the Ratón formation commencing at the Sangre de Cristo Mountains, a subset of the Rocky Mountains, from the west, 90 miles eastward to the Oklahoma border. Ratón Mesas include Black Mesa, Johnson Mesa, and Mesa de Maya. Fishers Peak is higher than any point in the United States east of its longitude.

Fishers Peak State Park
In 2020, Colorado Parks and Wildlife established Fishers Peak State Park. The park occupies the  parcel surrounding and including the peak that was formerly a privately held ranch. It opened in late October 2020.

Contiguous conservation areas
Adjoining Fishers Peak State Park on the east on the mesa below Fishers Peak are two Colorado State Wildlife Areas (SWA): Lake Dorothey, and James M. John, . Lake Dorothey also adjoins Sugarite Canyon State Park, in New Mexico.

See also

List of Colorado mountain ranges
List of Colorado mountain summits
List of Colorado fourteeners
List of Colorado 4000 meter prominent summits
List of the most prominent summits of Colorado
List of Colorado county high points

References

External links

Mountains of Colorado
Mountains of Las Animas County, Colorado
North American 2000 m summits